Arnold is a city in Jefferson County Missouri, United States and is also a suburb of St. Louis. The population was 20,850, at the 2020 United States Census.

History 
The first European settler in Arnold was Jean Baptiste Gamache, who operated a ferry boat across the Meramec River in exchange for 1050 arpents of land granted by the King of Spain. This ferry was on the King's Trace or El Camino Real, from St. Louis to Ste. Genevieve, Missouri.

Eminent domain 

Arnold was a focal point over the eminent domain issue in Missouri. In January 2004, the City of Arnold announced that THF Realty had approached them regarding developing a section of Arnold known as the Triangle, an area bordered by Route 141, Interstate 55 and Church Road in the city limits. The city voted in favor of the Triangle Development project proceeding on September 16, 2005.

According to an agreement with THF, Arnold would acquire the properties in the triangle and would be reimbursed its costs by THF. Arnold offered the property owners a buy-out, and most accepted. Some businesses were promised relocation  either in the new development or elsewhere in the city.  Others were not given this option. Some refused the offer, and the city moved to condemn the dissenting properties. One such hold out was Homer R. Tourkakis, the owner of a dental practice on the corner of the triangle formed by Route 141 and Interstate 55.

Tourkakis claims that THF never made a fair-market offer. THF claims they offered to rebuild his practice elsewhere and purchase his property for $600,000. Tourkakis's property was declared blighted, and Arnold sought to seize it under eminent domain. Tourkakis fought these proceedings in the Jefferson County courts. Arnold and THF argued that although incorporated cities are not explicitly granted the use of eminent domain does not imply they are denied it. The judge ruled that because Arnold is a third-class city, under Missouri law, it cannot use eminent domain to seize properties. In appeal to the Missouri Supreme Court, the decision was reversed, ruling that through the TIF act and the City of Arnold being an incorporated municipality, had the right to use eminent domain.

Red light cameras
In 2005, Arnold became the first city in Missouri to install red light cameras. A 2009 lawsuit against the cameras was dismissed on procedural grounds. In 2013 the Missouri Court of Appeals Eastern District ruled the Arnold red-light camera ordinance to be unconstitutional.

Notable events
On October 24, 1988 Republican vice-presidential candidate Dan Quayle addressed the students at Fox High School, listening to questions and discussing the fight on drugs.

On July 17, 1993 President Bill Clinton with several members of his cabinet held a "flood summit" at Fox High School during the Great Flood of 1993. During the summit, Clinton promised the governors of flood-damaged states that his administration would not abandon them once the water recedes.

On April 29, 2009, United States President Barack Obama held a town hall meeting commemorating his 100th day in office at Fox High School in Arnold. Several members of the presidents cabinet and staff attended the event including senior White House advisers Valerie Jarrett and David Axelrod and National Security Adviser James L. Jones.

Meramec River flooding 

The Meramec River crested at a record level of 47.26 feet on December 31, 2015, after a weekend of heavy rain, affecting over 300 homes and breaking the previous record crest from 1993. The floodwaters closed Interstate 55 at the Meramec just north of Arnold.

Flooding struck again in 2017 after heavy rains, with the Meramec cresting at 45.62 feet on May 3. Only the southbound lanes of I-55 were closed by floodwater. Approximately 20 homes were affected.

Geography
Arnold is located at  (38.432753, -90.369393).

The city is located at the confluence of the Meramec and Mississippi rivers, just south of St. Louis County.

Demographics

2010 census
As of the census of 2010, there were 20,808 people, 8,090 households, and 5,695 families living in the city. The racial makeup of the city was 96.3% White, 0.6% African American, 0.2% Native American, 0.9% Asian, 0.6% from other races, and 1.4% from two or more races. Hispanic or Latino of any race were 2.2% of the population.

There were 8,090 households, of which 34.1% had children under the age of 18 living with them, 52.3% were married couples living together, 12.9% had a female householder with no husband present, 5.2% had a male householder with no wife present, and 29.6% were non-families. 23.9% of all households were made up of individuals, and 9.7% had someone living alone who was 65 years of age or older. The average household size was 2.55 and the average family size was 3.02.

The median age in the city was 39.2 years. 23.3% of residents were under the age of 18; 8.6% were between the ages of 18 and 24; 26.3% were from 25 to 44; 27.4% were from 45 to 64; and 14.4% were 65 years of age or older. The gender makeup of the city was 48.7% male and 51.3% female.

2000 census
As of the census of 2000, there were 19,965 people, 7,550 households, and 5,564 families living in the city. The racial makeup of the city was 97.91% White, 0.30% African American, 0.21% Native American, 0.38% Asian, 0.02% Pacific Islander, 0.27% from other races, and 0.92% from two or more races. Hispanic or Latino of any race were 1.04% of the population.

There were 7,550 households, out of which 34.3% had children under the age of 18 living with them, 58.2% were married couples living together, 11.1% had a female householder with no husband present, and 26.3% were non-families. 22.0% of all households were made up of individuals, and 7.7% had someone living alone who was 65 years of age or older. The average household size was 2.61 and the average family size was 3.05.

In the city, the population was spread out, with 25.5% under the age of 18, 8.4% from 18 to 24, 30.4% from 25 to 44, 23.6% from 45 to 64, and 12.1% who were 65 years of age or older. The median age was 37 years. For every 100 females, there were 94.7 males. For every 100 females age 18 and over, there were 90.3 males.

The median income for a household in the city was $47,188, and the median income for a family was $53,664. Males had a median income of $37,972 versus $27,222 for females. The per capita income for the city was $20,378. About 3.0% of families and 4.4% of the population were below the poverty line, including 6.1% of those under age 18 and 3.6% of those age 65 or over.

Economy

In 2014, Anheuser-Busch InBev's subsidiary Metal Container Corp, announced plans to expand their aluminum can and bottle manufacturing plant in Arnold, making the city home to the largest can manufacturing facility in the country.

Arnold is home to one of two office's of the National Geospatial Intelligence Agency in the St Louis area employing at least 900 workers.

According to Money Magazine, Arnold was ranked the 12th best and most affordable city to live in the United States in 2008.

Parks and recreation

Arnold City Park is located off Jeffco Blvd. at #1 Bradley Beach Road. The 68-acre park has an 8-acre fishing lake and 4 pavilions, each with electricity and a BBQ pit. The park also offers a playground, paved 1/2-mile walking/hiking trail, 2 dirt multipurpose fields, 2 horseshoe pits, volleyball poles, Paw (dog) park, and fishing.

Ferd B. Lang Park is a 25-acre multi-use park located at 1820 Old Lemay Ferry Road. The park has 5 pavilions with electrical outlets and BBQ pits at each site. Other amenities include a playground, hiking trails, 2 grass multipurpose fields, 5 horseshoe pits, 3 sand volleyball courts, Arnold Jaycees Skate Park, half basketball court, Paw Park for Dogs, and restrooms (closed Nov 5, 2018 – Apr 8, 2019)

The City of Arnold offers a full service recreation center including workout center, walking track and swimming pool for a monthly fee. First Baptist Church of Arnold offers a free NCAA caliber gymnasium, weight rooms, cardio center, arts & craft center, indoor walking track. An orientation is required prior to use.

Education

The Fox C-6 School District operates public schools. Three elementary schools are in the city limits: Fox Elementary School, Rockport Heights Elementary School, and Sherwood Elementary School. Fox Middle School and Fox High School are in Arnold.

The Fox district was originally a K-8 school district, with high school students having a choice of Crystal City High School and Herculaneum High School. The district became K-12 when Fox High School was established in 1955.

Arnold has a public library, a branch of the Jefferson County Library.

The Jefferson College Missouri Arnold campus was opened in 2007 to expand educational services to those in northern Jefferson County. The 40,000 square feet (3,700 m2) facility is located at 1687 Missouri State Road behind the Arnold Library and Recreation Center.

Notable people
Louisa Frederici born in Arnold and married Buffalo Bill Cody
Frank J. Grass, General and Chief of National Guard Bureau
Dana Loesch, spokesperson for the NRA
Kenny Wallace, former NASCAR driver
Rusty Wallace, former NASCAR champion
Mike Wells, former NFL defensive tackle, 1994-2001

Locations
Wickes, a former stop on the Missouri Pacific Railroad
Women Against Registry, a national organization dedicated to abolishing the public Sex Offender Registry.

References

External links
 City of Arnold
 Arnold Chamber of Commerce
 Arnold Historical Society

Cities in Jefferson County, Missouri
Cities in Missouri